The  is one of five active Armies of the Japan Ground Self-Defense Force headquartered at Camp Asaka in Asaka, Saitama Prefecture. Its responsibility is the defense of the Kantō and the Northern half of the Chūbu region.

Organization 

  Eastern Army, at Camp Asaka in Asaka
  1st Division, at Camp Nerima in Nerima, responsible for the defense of Tokyo and the Chiba, Ibaraki, Kanagawa, Saitama, Shizuoka and Yamanashi prefectures.
  12th Brigade (Air Assault), at Camp Soumagahara in Shintō, responsible for the defense of Gunma, Nagano, Niigata and Tochigi prefectures.
 1st Engineer Brigade, at Camp Koga in Koga
 4th Engineer Group (Construction), at Camp Zama in Sagamihara
 5th Engineer Group (Construction), at Camp Takada in Jōetsu
 101st Equipment Company, at Camp Koga in Koga
 301st Vehicle Company, at Camp Koga in Koga
 306th Engineer Company, at Camp Matsumoto in Matsumoto
 307th Engineer Company, at Camp Utsunomiya in Utsunomiya
 Eastern Army Combined (Training) Brigade, at Camp Takeyama in Yokosuka
 31st Infantry Regiment, at Camp Takeyama in Yokosuka
 48th Infantry Regiment, at Camp Soumagahara in Shintō
 3rd Basic Training Battalion, at Camp Itazuma in Gotemba
 117th Training Battalion, at Camp Takeyama in Yokosuka
 Woman Army Corps Training Unit, at Camp Asaka in Asaka
 2nd Anti-Aircraft Artillery Group, at Camp Matsudo in Matsudo, with Type 3 Chū-SAMs
 Eastern Army Aviation Group, at Camp Tachikawa in Tachikawa
 4th Anti-tank Helicopter Battalion, at Camp Kisarazu in Kisarazu
 Eastern Army Helicopter Battalion, at Camp Tachikawa in  Tachikawa
 Eastern Army Meteorological Company, at Camp Tachikawa in  Tachikawa
 Logistic Support Battalion, at Camp Tachikawa in  Tachikawa
 Eastern Army Signal Group, at Camp Asaka in Asaka
 105th Signal Battalion,  at Camp Asaka in Asaka
 105th Command Center Signal Battalion, at Camp Asaka in Asaka
 304th Central Communication Company, at Camp Asaka in Asaka
 Eastern Army Logistic Support Troop, at Camp Asaka in Asaka
 Kantō Logistic Depot, at Camp Kasumigaura in Tsuchiura
 Eastern Army Finance Service, at Camp Asaka in Asaka
 Eastern Army Medical Service, at Camp Asaka in Asaka
 Eastern Army Command Post Training Support, at Camp Asaka in Asaka
 Eastern Army Intelligence Analysis, at Camp Asaka in Asaka
 Eastern Army Band, at Camp Asaka in Asaka

External links 
 Eastern Army Homepage (Japanese)

Armies of the Japan Ground Self-Defense Force
Military units and formations established in 1960